Bank of America Building may refer to:
Bank of America Building (Athens, Georgia)
9454 Wilshire Boulevard, also known as the Bank of America Building in Beverly Hills, California
Bank of America Building (Baltimore), Maryland
Bank of America Building (Chicago), Illinois
Bank of America Building (Midland), Texas
Bank of America Building (Oakland), California
111 Westminster Street, Providence, Rhode Island, formerly known as the Bank of America Building
Bank of America Building (San Jose, California)

See also
 Bank of America Center (disambiguation)
 Bank of America Plaza (disambiguation)
 Bank of America Tower (disambiguation)